The Central District of Nishapur County ( is a district (bakhsh) in Nishapur County, Razavi Khorasan Province, Iran. At the 2006 census, its population was 274,700, in 74,946 families.  The district has one city: Nishapur.  The district has five rural districts (dehestan): Binalud Rural District, Darbqazi Rural District, Fazl Rural District, Mazul Rural District, and Rivand Rural District.

References 

Districts of Razavi Khorasan Province
Nishapur County